Kot Lakhpat (Punjabi language) is a residential neighborhood and union council of Gulberg Tehsil in Lahore, Punjab, Pakistan. The neighborhood is both a residential and industrial area. It is located at 31° 27' 57N 74° 20' 14E.  

Kot Lakhpat is bordered by the Defence Housing Society to the east and Lahore Township to the west. Kot Lakhpat railway station, Lahore Race Club, Quaid-e-Azam Industrial Estate and Central Jail Lahore which is commonly known as Kot Lakhpat Jail are situated in this neighbourhood.

References

Gulberg, Lahore